Fernando José Bernardo Tavares (born 2 May 1980), commonly known as Bernardo Tavares, is a Portuguese football manager and former player. He is the manager of Indonesian club PSM Makassar.

Playing career
Tavares began his footballing career when he was 10 years old with the youth team of ADC Proença-a-Nova, based in his hometown, Proença-a-Nova. In 1996, he began his professional footballing career with the senior team of ADC and played for the club until he became a 23-year-old youngster in the Campeonato Nacional de Seniores. In 2000, he helped his parent club win the Castelo Branco Football Association Cup.

Managerial career
Tavares holds the UEFA Pro Licence, regarded as the highest football coaching qualification. He received his Licence in June 2013 from the Portuguese Football Federation, at a camp at which he was awarded the Best Coach award. He also holds the Pro License on goalkeeping from the Portuguese Football Federation and participated in a Sports Massage course hosted by the Leiria Football Association.

Proença-a-Nova U18
Tavares began his managerial career with the U-18 team of his parent club in 1997.

Pastelaria Rosa
In 1998, Tavares moved to a bakery club named Pastelaria Rosa FC where he was first appointed as the head coach of the U-18 team and then moved on to coach the senior team in 1999.

Escola Superior de Desporto de Rio Maior (ESDRM)
In 2000, Tavares moved to Rio Maior where he was appointed as the head coach of a University National League football club Escola Superior de Desporto de Rio Maior.

Benfica
In 2001, Tavares moved to Lisbon where he was appointed as the assistant coach of the U-12 team of S.L. Benfica.

Alcobaça
In the same year, Tavares moved to Alcobaça where he worked as the head coach of various youth teams of the club (U-14, U-15, U-16, and U-18) and also as the assistant coach of the first team from 2002–2005. In 2005, he was appointed as the head coach of the first team of the club and he continued to work in the same post until 2008. During his stint as the head coach of the Alcobaça-based club, he helped the club win the AFL Cup in 2005–06 and 2006–07.

FC Porto (scout)
In 2008, Tavares moved to Porto, where he was appointed as the scout of FC Porto.

Sporting CP youth and academy
Tavares moved back to Lisbon in 2008, where he was appointed as the head coach of Sporting C.P. Youth and Academy. During his time with the Lisbon-based academy, he helped them win the 2008–09 Sub-10 International Tournament.

Carregado
In 2009, Tavares moved to Carregado where he was appointed as the assistant manager of A.D. Carregado.

Belenenses
In 2010, Tavares moved back to Lisbon where he was appointed as the assistant coach (worked under José Mota) of Liga de Honra club C.F. Os Belenenses. In 2011, he was appointed as the head coach of the same club.

Gil Vicente (scout)
In 2012, Tavares was appointed as the scout of Primeira Liga club Gil Vicente F.C.

Al-Hidd

Tavares first moved away from Portugal in 2013 to Bahrain, where he was appointed as the assistant coach (worked under Adnan Ebrahim Showaiter and Khalifa Al-Zayani) of Bahraini Premier League club Al-Hidd SCC. He helped the club secure the 3rd position in the 2013–14 Bahraini Premier League which to date is the club's best finish in history. They also had a successful run in the 2014 AFC Champions League where they entered as a qualifying play-off Round 1 participant. In Round 1, the club posted a resounding 3–1 victory over their hosts, 2012–13 Jordan League champions, Shabab Al-Ordon Club. In Round 2, the Bahraini club were defeated 2-1 by 2012–13 Qatar Stars League runners-up Lekhwiya SC at the Abdullah bin Khalifa Stadium and hence failed to advance to the AFC Champions League group stage. As a result, the club got a direct entry into the 2014 AFC Cup group stage. The club finished second in Group C which included 2013 Kuwait Emir Cup winners, Al-Qadsia SC (finished as the winners of 2014 AFC Cup), 2012–13 Iraqi Elite League champions Al-Shorta SC and 2013 Syrian Cup winners, Al-Wahda SC Damascus and hence advanced to the 2014 AFC Cup knock-out stage. In the Round of 16, the club secured a 1–0 win over 2012–13 Lebanese Premier League champions, Al-Safa' SC and advanced to the Quarter-finals. In the Quarter-finals the Bahraini club again met their group mate, Al-Qadsia SC. In the First leg, the club played a 1–1 draw against hosts and in the Second leg the club again played out a draw with the visitors (2-2) but were unlucky as the visitors advanced to the Semi-finals on away goals rule. This was again club's best ever performance in an Asian Football Confederation competition.

Tirsense
In 2014, Tavares moved back to Portugal and more accurately to Santo Tirso, where he was appointed as the head coach of Portuguese Second Division club F.C. Tirsense

Al-Nahda

In 2015, Tavares moved back to the Middle East and more accurately to Oman where he was appointed as the head coach of 2013–14 Oman Professional League winners, Al-Nahda Club. His first match as head in-charge of the club was on 17 February 2015 in a 2–1 win over 2014 GCC Champions League runners-up, Saham SC. He also made an appearance as the assistant coach of the club in a 2–1 loss against 2013–14 Qatar Stars League runners-up, El Jaish SC in the preliminary round 2 of 2015 AFC Champions League qualifying play-off and hence failed to advance to the 2015 AFC Champions League group stage. He was also head in-charge of the club in the 2015 AFC Cup. The club began the campaign on a flying note as they secured a 2–1 win over 2013–14 Syrian Premier League winners, Al-Wahda SC Damascus.

African Lyon
Tavares first moved to Africa and more accurately to Tanzania in August 2016, where he signed a one-year contract with Tanzanian Premier League side, African Lyon F.C. He made his debut appearance as a manager in the Tanazanian Premier League on 21 August 2016 in a 1–1 draw against 2015–16 Tanzanian Premier League runners-up, Azam F.C. Later due to some financial delays, the Portuguese decided to part ways with the Tanzanian side.

New Radiant
On 16 January 2017, Tavares signed a one-year contract to be appointed as the head coach of Maldivian side, New Radiant S.C.

Benfica de Macau
On 18 January 2018, S.L. Benfica de Macau announced Bernardo Tavares as their new coach.

Churchill Brothers
In November 2019, Churchill Brothers announced Tavares as their new head coach.

HIFK
On 21 December 2021, he signed a contract for the 2022 season with HIFK in Finland, with an option for the 2023 season.

Other roles
Tavares has had many other jobs in his footballing career. In 2002, he started working as the head coach and technical director of Escolinha de Futebol do Bernardo where he worked until 2013, despite holidng other jobs during this time perio. From 2002–2004, he worked as the Youth Football coordinator of G.C. Alcobaça. He also worked as the Futsal coordinator of ADC Proença-a-Nova from 2006–2009. In 2009–2010, he coordinated goalkeeper training at A.D. Carregado. From 2010–2012, he worked as the coordinator of the Department of Professional Football Scouting at C.F. Os Belenenses.

Training reporter
Tavares also had the job of making training reports for several European clubs. He first enrolled in this job in 2001 when he worked with Primeira Liga club U.D. Leiria under head coach, José Mourinho. He also worked with La Liga club Real Madrid C.F. in 2004 under head coach, Carlos Queiroz. In 2008, he worked with Sporting CP under head coach, Paulo Bento and in 2014 he worked with F.C. Paços de Ferreira under head coach, Paulo Fonseca.

Honorable mentions
In 2006, Tavares received a mention of thanks and praise for having won two AFL Cups as the head coach of G.C. Alcobaça. He has also received an award of distinction for graduating from the Escola Superior de Desporto de Rio Maior.

Honours

Player
Proença-a-Nova
Castelo Branco Football Association Cup Runners-up: 1999–2000

Manager
Alcobaça
AFL Cup: 2005–06, 2006–07
Sporting CP academy
Sub-10 International Tournament: 2008–09

WON 8 TROPHIES
 1 Premier League Macao (China)
 1 Super Cup "Bolinha" Hong Kong/Macau
 1 Premier League in Maldives
 1 President's Cup in Maldives
 1 FA Cup in Maldives
 2 AFL Cups in Portugal
 1 Youth League in Portugal

Saved 11 Teams from relegation

Individual
 Liga 1 Coach of the Month: August 2022, September 2022

References

External links
Official website

Bernardo Tavares CV - YouTube
Bernardo Tavares - YouTube

1980 births
Living people
People from Proença-a-Nova
Association football midfielders
Portuguese footballers
Portuguese football managers
G.C. Alcobaça managers
Portuguese expatriate football managers
Al-Nahda Club (Oman) managers
Churchill Brothers FC Goa managers
HIFK Fotboll managers
Oman Professional League managers
Expatriate football managers in Bahrain
Portuguese expatriate sportspeople in Bahrain
Expatriate football managers in Oman
Portuguese expatriate sportspeople in Oman
Expatriate football managers in Tanzania
Portuguese expatriate sportspeople in Tanzania
Expatriate football managers in India
Portuguese expatriate sportspeople in India
Expatriate football managers in Finland
Portuguese expatriate sportspeople in Finland
Sportspeople from Castelo Branco District